CJSB-FM is an adult contemporary and country formatted broadcast radio station licensed to and serving Swan River, Manitoba, Canada. CJSB-FM is currently owned and operated by Stillwater Broadcasting Limited. Its sister company, 5777152 Manitoba, operates CJBP-FM in Neepawa.

The station features local news and local information. The studio is located in the heart of downtown Swan River at 515 Main Street.

History
On April 21, 2006, Stillwater Broadcasting Limited received CRTC approval to operate a new FM radio station in Swan River, Manitoba on the frequency of 104.5 MHz.

On August 19, 2010, CJSB-FM applied to add an FM transmitter in Benito, Manitoba on the frequency of 99.1 MHz to rebroadcast the programming of CJSB-FM Swan River. This application to add a new transmitter at Benito received CRTC approval on November 24, 2010.

Trivia
The callsign CJSB was used on a former AM radio station out of Ottawa, Ontario, known today as CKQB-FM.

References

External links
 CJ-104
 
 

Jsb
Jsb
Radio stations established in 2006
2006 establishments in Manitoba